Natalie Cree Kelly, known professionally as Natalie Mars (born February 3, 1984) is an American transgender pornographic actress and model. She won the Most Popular Trans Performer Award at the 1st Pornhub Awards in 2018 and at the 2nd Pornhub Awards in 2019. She was the most nominated and most awarded adult film performer at the 11th Transgender Erotica Awards in 2019 and tied with Daisy Taylor for most awards at the 12th Transgender Erotica Awards in 2020. In 2020, Mars won the AVN Award for Transgender Performer of the Year during the 37th AVN Awards, having previously been nominated for that category twice before, at the 35th AVN Awards and the 36th AVN Awards. In 2020, Mars was also a recipient of the Best Transsexual Artist of the Year Award at the XBIZ Awards, the winner of Best Self-Producer at the 13th Transgender Erotica Awards, and a winner of Best Bi Sex Scene at the GayVN Awards.

Biography 
Mars was born on February 3, 1984, in Fort Lauderdale, Florida, and grew up in Little Rock, Arkansas, moving around a lot in her childhood. She later moved from Arkansas to Las Vegas. 

In 2015, she made her debut in the pornographic film industry and has since acted in over three hundred adult films produced by Pure TS, Gender X, Grooby Productions, Pulse Distribution, Trans Angels, Devil's Film, Mile High, Kink.com, Trans500, Transsensuals, Goodfellas, and Evil Angel. 

In 2018, Mars won Most Popular Trans Performer at the 1st Pornhub Awards and, in 2019, she won the award again at the 2nd Pornhub Awards. In 2020, she won an AVN and an XBIZ Award for Best Transsexual Artist of the Year. She was nominated for the same category in 2021. She had previously been nominated for the same award at the 35th AVN Awards in 2017 and the 36th AVN Awards in 2019. In 2020, she won Best Self-Producer at the 13th Transgender Erotica Awards. She was also a winner of Best Bi Sex Scene at the GayVN Awards in 2020. Mars won the Editor's Choice for Best Transexual Performer in 2019 and the Fan's Choice for Best Transsexual Performer in 2020 at the NightMoves Awards.

In 2019, Mars was featured on the cover of ManyVids's magazine MV. 

In 2022, the American sex toy company Doc Johnson announced that Mars would be the face of their new sex doll line.

References

External links 

Living people
1984 births
Actresses from Fort Lauderdale, Florida
American female adult models
American pornographic film actresses
LGBT people from Florida
Transgender female adult models
Transgender Erotica Award winners
Transgender pornographic film actresses